Abdulrahman Al Qahtani (born 22 May 1983) is a Saudi Arabian footballer.
He started his career with Ettifaq in 2001 and he played for the team until 2007 when he was loaned to Ittihad in an 8.5 million riyals deal, which was the most expensive locally. After that he returned to Ettifaq. After two years at Nassr, he had made a 17 million riyals deal for four years, but he gave a poor performance in comparison to his price. His most famous nicknames is "The Maestro" because of his way to move and play making.
Al Qahtani has made several appearances for the Saudi Arabia national football team, including two qualifying matches for the 2010 FIFA World Cup.

Honours

Club
Al Fateh
 Saudi Super Cup : 2013

International
Saudi Arabia
Islamic Solidarity Games: 2005
 AFC Asian Cup : Runner-up 2007

References

External links

1983 births
Living people
People from Dammam
Saudi Arabian footballers
Saudi Arabia international footballers
2007 AFC Asian Cup players
Ittihad FC players
Association football wingers
Ettifaq FC players
Al Nassr FC players
Al-Fateh SC players
Saudi First Division League players
Saudi Professional League players